The Surna is a river in Trøndelag and Møre og Romsdal counties in Norway. It runs from Rindal Municipality (in Trøndelag) to Surnadal Municipality (in Møre og Romsdal). The river then flows west and empties into the Surnadalsfjorden at the village of Surnadalsøra. Several smaller rivers flow into the Surna from the Trollheimen mountains to the south. The Foldsjøen and Gråsjøen reservoirs along the Folda River also flow into the Surna. The river is a good fishing river. The Brandåa, Gryta, and Kysinga hydroelectric power stations operate on tributaries of the river.

See also
List of rivers in Norway

References

Rindal
Surnadal
Rivers of Trøndelag
Rivers of Møre og Romsdal
Rivers of Norway